Warrior // Worrier is the fifth studio album by Denmark-based band Outlandish. It was released on 28 May 2012 by Sony Music. The album received Gold certification from the International Federation of the Phonographic Industry in Denmark.

Tracklist
"Gypsy Cab" (3:48)	
"Warrior//Worrier" (4:30)	
"Barrio" (3:53)	
"Sky Is Ours" (3:42)	
"Better Days" (3:54)	
"The Start" (5:00)	
"Ready to Love" (3:55)	
"Breathin' Under Water" (feat. Amir Sulaiman) (3:25)	
"A Mind Full of Whispers" (3:45)	
"Into the Night" (3:53)	
"Gangsta Like Crazy" (4:21)	
"Dreamin' & Streamin'" (feat. Rune RK) (3:36)	
"Triumf" (feat. Providers) (3:25)

References

Outlandish albums
2012 albums
Sony Music albums